Alien Boy: The Life and Death of James Chasse is an American feature-length documentary film, released in 2013 and directed by Brian Lindstrom.  The film explores issues of police accountability in the case of James Chasse, a man with schizophrenia who was killed by Portland, Oregon police officers in 2006. The title refers to a song about him, "Alien Boy" by the Wipers.

In Family of James Chasse v City of Portland, Judge Garr King added the film to the case gag order and was asked by Portland city attorneys for a change of venue based on teasers for Alien Boy.  The case was settled in 2011 for $1.6 million and instructed an investigation by the Department of Justice which found the Portland Police Bureau "engages in a pattern or practice of excessive force" against persons with mental illness. Prior settlements in 2009 included $925,000 from Multnomah County and a reported $600,000 from American Medical Rescue. Members of Portland City Council agreed with DOJ findings in a settlement signed in November 2012.

The film was produced by the Mental Health Association of Portland, a nonprofit advocacy organization and distributed by Breaking Glass Pictures.

Alien Boy: the Life and Death of James Chasse premiered at the Portland International Film Festival in February 2013. It is an official selection of the 2013 Big Sky Documentary Film Festival, Minneapolis–Saint Paul International Film Festival, Cinema Pacific Film Festival (Eugene, Oregon), Astoria International Film Festival, Local Sightings Film Festival (Seattle), and Rendezvous With Madness (Toronto).

The film was reviewed in a number of publications including the Seattle Weekly, The Seattle Times, and The Stranger. Rotten Tomatoes rates the film 87%.

References

External links
 
 

American documentary films
Documentary films about schizophrenia
2013 films
2013 documentary films
Films set in Oregon
Films shot in Oregon
Documentary films about law enforcement in the United States
2010s English-language films
2010s American films